El Retiro is a corregimiento in Antón District, Coclé Province, Panama. Its population as of 1990 was 1,801; its population as of 2000 was 1,998.

References

Corregimientos of Coclé Province